Ariel Beltramo (born August 20, 1969) is an Argentine former professional footballer who played as a forward for clubs in Argentina, Chile, Peru, Italy, Israel, Colombia and Guatemala.

References
 

1969 births
Living people
Argentine footballers
Association football forwards
Talleres de Córdoba footballers
Club Atlético River Plate footballers
Club de Gimnasia y Esgrima La Plata footballers
Club Atlético Lanús footballers
Universidad de Chile footballers
Club Universitario de Deportes footballers
Club Deportivo Palestino footballers
Deportes Tolima footballers
Maccabi Ahi Nazareth F.C. players
S.S. Chieti Calcio players
A.S.D. Francavilla players
Argentine Primera División players
Categoría Primera A players
Chilean Primera División players
Liga Leumit players
Argentine expatriate footballers
Expatriate footballers in Chile
Expatriate footballers in Peru
Expatriate footballers in Guatemala
Expatriate footballers in Colombia
Expatriate footballers in Israel
Expatriate footballers in Italy
Argentine expatriate sportspeople in Chile
Argentine expatriate sportspeople in Peru
Argentine expatriate sportspeople in Guatemala
Argentine expatriate sportspeople in Colombia
Argentine expatriate sportspeople in Israel
Argentine expatriate sportspeople in Italy